The Rhode Island School of Design (RISD , pronounced "Riz-D") is a private art and design school in Providence, Rhode Island. The school was founded as a coeducational institution in 1877 by Helen Adelia Rowe Metcalf, who sought to increase the accessibility of design education to women. Today, RISD offers bachelor's and master's degree programs across 19 majors and enrolls approximately 2,000 undergraduate and 500 graduate students. The Rhode Island School of Design Museum—which houses the school's art and design collections—is one of the largest college art museums in the United States.

The Rhode Island School of Design is affiliated with Brown University, whose campus sits immediately adjacent to RISD's on Providence's College Hill. The two institutions share social and community resources and since 1900 have permitted cross-registration. Together, RISD and Brown offer dual degree programs at the graduate and undergraduate levels.

As of 2022, RISD alumni have received 10 MacArthur Genius fellowships, five Primetime Emmy Awards, and three Academy Awards. A 2016 analysis of the most successful American artists at auction found that the vast plurality held undergraduate degrees from RISD.

History

Founding of the school 

The Rhode Island School of Design's founding is often traced back to Helen Adelia Rowe Metcalf's 1876 visit to the Centennial Exposition in Philadelphia. At the exposition, Metcalf visited the Women's Pavilion. Organized by the "Centennial Women," the pavilion showcased the work of female entrepreneurs, artists, and designers. Metcalf's visit to the pavilion profoundly impacted her and motivated her to address a deficiency in design education accessible to women.

Following the exhibition, the RI committee of the Centennial Women had $1,675 remaining in funds; the group spent some time negotiating how best to use the surplus. Metcalf lobbied the group to use the money to establish a coeducational, design school in Providence. On January 11, 1877, a majority of women on the committee voted for Metcalf's proposal. 
On March 22, 1877, the Rhode Island General Assembly ratified "An Act to Incorporate the Rhode Island School of Design", "[f]or the purpose of aiding in the cultivation of the arts of design". Over the next 129 years, the following original by-laws set forth these following primary objectives:

The instruction of artisans in drawing, painting, modeling, and designing, that they may successfully apply the principles of Art to the requirements of trade and manufacture.
The systematic training of students in the practice of Art, in order that they may understand its principles, give instruction to others, or become artists.
The general advancement of public Art Education, by the exhibition of works of Art and of Art school studies, and by lectures on Art.
Metcalf directed the school until her death in 1895. Her daughter, Eliza Greene Metcalf Radeke, then took over until her own death in 1931.

Beginnings 
The school opened in October 1877 in Providence. The first class consisted of 43 students, the majority of whom were women.

For the first 15 years of its existence, RISD occupied a suite of six rooms on the fourth floor of the Hoppin Homestead Building in Downtown Providence. On October 24, 1893, the school dedicated a new brick building at 11 Waterman Street on College Hill. Designed by Hoppin, Reid & Hoppin, this building served as the first permanent home for the school.

Activism during the Vietnam War
Students at RISD played a key part in the national protest of the Vietnam War, producing various notable anti-war protest art from 1968-1973 and taking several on tour as part of a mobile artwork petition. The most well known is Leave the Fear of Red to Horned Beasts, a reference to Victor Hugo novel Les Misérables in the form of a watercolor-on-canvas painting of a charging red bull. An original print of this painting is on permanent display at the War Remnants Museum in Ho Chi Minh City, Vietnam in a section dedicated to international protest of the Vietnam War, and also features subtly as a bar mural in Vietnam War film Point Man (film).

In 1969 the Black Student Community of RISD published a manifesto demanding of university faculty the establishment of "a meaningful liaison with the spirit and expression of Black culture." RISD subsequently hired administrators to begin recruiting and admitting increased numbers of students of color.

COVID-19 
After the outbreak of COVID-19 and the subsequent closure of the RISD campus in March 2020, RISD suggested a future of a hybrid of classes online and in-person.

In July 2020, President Somerson began negotiations with the RISD faculty union over the avoidance of possible layoffs by suggesting cost-cutting measures. The part-time faculty union, the National Education Association, rejected the initial proposal.

Racial diversity and equity 
In the summer of 2020, after the Black Lives Matter and George Floyd protests, RISD students and alumni came forward to voice outrage at the institution for failing at social equity and inclusion. They formed a student-led RISD Anti-Racism Coalition (ARC) alongside BIPOC faculty. As a result, in July 2020, RISD announced they would hire 10 new faculty members that would specialize in "race and ethnicity in arts and design", the RISD museum would return to Nigeria a sculpture that was once looted, expand and diversify the curriculum, and the school would, "remain committed to reform".

Presidents 

RISD's current president is Crystal Williams. She was preceded by Rosanne Somerson who served in the role from 2015 to 2021.

Rankings and admission 
In 2014, U.S. News & World Report ranked RISD first amongst Fine Arts programs. In 2021, RISD was ranked 4th by the QS World University Rankings of Art & Design programs. The school's undergraduate architecture program ranked 6 in DesignIntelligence's ranking of the Top Architecture Schools in the US for 2019. In 2018, the institution was also named among Forbes’ America's Top Colleges and the Chronicle of Higher Education's Top Producers of US Fulbright Scholars.

RISD's 2020 acceptance rate for admission applications received in the fall of 2020 was 20%. In August of 2019, the school announced it would be adopting a test-optional policy for admissions.

Campus

In the past, RISD buildings were mostly located at the western edge of College Hill, between the Brown University campus and the Providence River. In recent decades, RISD has acquired or built buildings on the downslope nearer the river, or in Downtown Providence just on the other side of the waterway. The main library, undergrad dormitories, and graduate studios of the college are now located downtown.

RISD Museum

The RISD Museum was founded in 1877 on the belief that art, artists, and the institutions that support them play pivotal roles in promoting broad civic engagement and creating more open societies. With a permanent collection numbering approximately 100,000 works, the RISD museum is the third largest art museum attached to an educational facility.

Athletics
RISD has many athletic clubs and teams. The symbolism used for their teams is unique. The hockey team is called the "Nads", and their cheer is "Go Nads!" The logo for the Nads features a horizontal hockey stick with two hockey pucks at the end of the stick's handle.

The basketball team is known simply as the "Balls", and their slogan is, "When the heat is on, the Balls stick together." The Balls' logo consists of two balls next to one another in an irregularly shaped net.

Lest the sexual innuendo of these team names and logos be lost or dismissed, the 2001 creation of the school's unofficial mascot, Scrotie, ended any ambiguity. Despite the name, Scrotie is not merely a representation of a scrotum, but is a 7-foot tall penis.

Notable people

Alumni 

Notable RISD alumni in the fine arts Kara Walker (MFA 1994), Jenny Holzer (MFA 1977), Dale Chihuly (MFA 1968), Nicole Eisenman (BFA 1987), Do-Ho Suh (BFA 1994), Julie Mehretu (MFA 1997), Roni Horn (BFA 1975), Shahzia Sikander (MFA 1995), Glenn Ligon, and Janine Antoni (MFA 1989). Graduates in photography include Francesca Woodman (BFA 1978), Deana Lawson (MFA 2004), and Todd Hido.

Among the school's alumni in illustration are Brian Selznick (BFA 1988), Chris Van Allsburg (MA 1975), Roz Chast (BFA 1977), and David Macaulay (BArch 1969). Alumni in graphic design include Shepard Fairey (BFA 1992) Tobias Frere-Jones (BFA 1992). Among the alumni of the school's architecture department are Hashim Sarkis (BArch 1987) Deborah Berke (BFA 1975, BArch 1977), Preston Scott Cohen (BArch 1983), and Nader Tehrani (BArch 1986).

Prominent RISD graduates in film and television include James Franco (MFA 2012), Seth MacFarlane (BFA 1995), Jemima Kirke (BFA 2008), Bryan Konietzko (BFA 1998), Michael Dante DiMartino (BFA 1996), Gus Van Sant (BFA 1975), and Robert Richardson (BFA 1979). Graduates in music include bassist Syd Butler (BFA 1996) and the three founding members of Talking Heads: David Byrne, Tina Weymouth (BFA 1974), and Chris Frantz (BFA 1974).

Among the school's alumni in business are Airbnb co-founders Joe Gebbia (BFA 2004) and Brian Chesky (BFA 2004).

Faculty 
Notable RISD faculty include photographers Diane Arbus and Aaron Siskind, sculptor Simone Leigh, painter Jennifer Packer, architect Friedrich St. Florian, designer Victor Papanek, and Pulitzer Prize-winning author Jhumpa Lahiri.

References

External links

 
Art schools in Rhode Island
Design schools in the United States
Architecture schools in Rhode Island
Landscape architecture schools
Educational institutions established in 1877
Graphic design schools in the United States
Animation schools in the United States
1877 establishments in Rhode Island
Private universities and colleges in Rhode Island
Glassmaking schools